Meant to Be is a 2017 Philippine television drama comedy romance series broadcast by GMA Network. Directed by LA Madridejos, it stars Ken Chan, Jak Roberto, Addy Raj, Ivan Dorschner and Barbie Forteza. It premiered on January 9, 2017 on the network's Telebabad line-up replacing Someone to Watch Over Me. The series concluded on June 23, 2017 with a total of 118 episodes. It was replaced by I Heart Davao in its timeslot.

The series is streaming online on YouTube.

Premise
Billie has issues in life. Her parents are not in good terms and her brother Bats is jobless. While her friendship with her best friend will be put to the test when she meets four guys of different nationalities who will compete against each other for her.

Cast and characters

Lead cast
 Ken Chan as Yuan Cruz Lee
 Jak Roberto as Andres "Andoy" dela Cruz
 Addy Raj as Jai Patel
 Ivan Dorschner as Ethan Spencer-Hughes
 Barbie Forteza as Maria Belinda "Billie" Bendiola

Supporting cast
 Manilyn Reynes as Amelia "Mamay" Altamirano-Bendiola
 Sheryl Cruz as Beatriz Spencer Del Valle
 Tina Paner as Suzy Altamirano
 Keempee de Leon as Wilton "Pawie" Bendiola
 Sef Cadayona as Wilbert "Bats" Bendiola
 Gloria Romero as Madonna "Madj" Sta. Maria
 Stephanie Sol as Carmina "Cacai / Cai" Bahaghari
 Zymic Jaranilla as Christopher "Toti" Del Valle Bendiola
 Mika dela Cruz as Mariko Altamirano

Recurring cast
 Nikki Co as Joshua Lee 
 David Uy as Jason Lee 
 Bernadette Allyson-Estrada as Lorena Cruz-Lee
 Kevin Santos as Bong   
 Tess Bomb as Betchay
 Divine Tetay as Diva
 Vince Gamad as Dan
 Coleen Perez as Grace 
 Dea Formilleza as Molly
 Philip Lazaro as Millicent
 Janno Gibbs as Adonis Adlawan
 Ronaldo Valdez as Enrico "Ric" Villaroman
 Dave Bornea as Andrew Zapata
 Matthias Rhoads as Gordon Smith
 Vince Vandorpe as Calvin "Avi" Del Valle Jacobs
 Carl Cervantes as Alexander "Yexel" Smith
 Arra San Agustin as Mia Smith
 Isabella de Leon as Yumi Mercado
 Ayra Mariano as Nikki
 Klea Pineda as Flo

Guest cast
 Antonio Aquitania as Dad
 Ashley "Petra Mahalimuyak" Rivera as Gretch
 Betong Sumaya as a homeless man
 Wowie de Guzman as Owep
 Roi Vinzon as Jose Dela Cruz
 Jay Manalo as Melchor Dela Cruz
 Sharmaine Arnaiz as Edna Dela Cruz
 Althea Ablan as Apple Dela Cruz
 Ralph Noriega as Jason Dela Cruz
 Mosang as Fortune Teller
 Pekto as Topeks
 Vincent de Jesus as a camp facilitator
 Angel Aviles as Ric's grandchild
 Lance Serrano as a driver
 Prince Clemente as Bogs
 Vj Mendoza as Eugene
 Arra Pascual as herself
 Jennifer Lee as herself
 Khai Lim as herself 
 Jeron Teng as himself
 Jay Arcilla as a bar swimmer
 Liezel Lopez as a bar swimmer
 Rojean delos Reyes as Hailey
 Denise Barbacena as a bar swimmer
 Atak Arana as Direk
 Kim Idol as Shala
 Louise Bolton as Diane
 Mara Alberto as Gia
 Max Collins as Onay Wiz
 Nicole Dulalia as April Sta. Maria
 Rob Moya as a drug dealer

Ratings
According to AGB Nielsen Philippines' Nationwide Urban Television Audience Measurement, the pilot episode of Meant to Be earned a 16.8% rating. While from AGB Nielsen Philippines' Nationwide Urban Television Audience Measurement people in television homes, the final episode scored a 10.3% rating.

Accolades

References

External links
 
 

2017 Philippine television series debuts
2017 Philippine television series endings
Filipino-language television shows
GMA Network drama series
Philippine romantic comedy television series
Television shows set in Quezon City
Television shows set in Singapore